The 1979 Long Beach State 49ers football team represented California State University, Long Beach during the 1979 NCAA Division I-A football season.

Cal State Long Beach competed in the Pacific Coast Athletic Association. The team was led by third year head coach Dave Currey, and played home games at Anaheim Stadium in Anaheim, California. They finished the season with a record of seven wins, four losses (7–4, 3–2 PCAA).

Schedule

Notes

References

Long Beach State
Long Beach State 49ers football seasons
Long Beach State 49ers football